Peter Eriksson (born 29 September 1960) is a Swedish sailor. He competed in the Flying Dutchman event at the 1988 Summer Olympics.

References

1960 births
Living people
Swedish male sailors (sport)
Olympic sailors of Sweden
Sailors at the 1988 Summer Olympics – Flying Dutchman
Sportspeople from Gothenburg